Re Grant's Will Trusts [1979] 3 All ER 359 is an English trusts law case, concerning the policy of the "beneficiary principle" and unincorporated associations.

Facts
A bequest was given 'to the Labour Party Property Committee for the benefit of the Chertsey Headquarters of the Chertsey and Walton Constituency Labour Party' and if the Constituency Labour Party (CLP) moved from the Chertsey UDC area his estate would pass to the National Labour Party. Its rules, which bound the members, could be altered by a non member: the National Executive Committee of the Labour Party. This meant that unlike a normal association, the members could not unanimously agree to waive the rules and divide the property between themselves.

Judgment
Vinelott J held that the estate was to be kept intact as endowment capital on trust for the Labour Party’s purposes, and therefore was void for infringing the beneficiary principle and the rule against inalienability. The Re Recher analysis (that donations take effect as accretions to the group’s funds, subject to the contract that exists between the members) could not be applied. Referring to Re Denley's he continued.

References

English trusts case law
High Court of Justice cases
1979 in case law
1979 in British law